Rindal is a municipality in Møre og Romsdal county, Norway.

Rindal may also refer to:

People
Arnt Rindal (1938–2015), Norwegian diplomat who has served as ambassador to several countries
Johannes Rindal (born 1984), Norwegian politician for the Centre Party

Places
Rindal (village), the administrative centre of Rindal Municipality in Møre og Romsdal county, Norway
Rindal Church, a church in Rindal Municipality in Møre og Romsdal county, Norway